Donald Angelini (September 30, 1926 – December 6, 2000) was a mobster nicknamed "The Wizard of Odds" with the Chicago Outfit, a criminal organization that specialized in gambling operations.

Career
After years in the Outfit, Angelini became the caporegime for a crew operating illegal gambling rackets in Elmhurst, Illinois. Angelini operated a highly successful sports betting empire along with Dominic Cortina. He was the brother-in-law to Chicago Outfit mobster Michael Caracci.

In 1986, Angelini became the Outfit's enforcer in Las Vegas; his job was to protect the Outfit's illegal casino profits. Angelini replaced Chicago mobster Tony "The Ant" Spilotro in running the skim. Tony Spilotro and his brother, Michael Spilotro, had been killed by the Chicago Outfit. White haired, trim, and very well-spoken with a pleasant smile, Angelini was a total opposite of the brutal Spilotro. Angelini found himself operating with a new crew in Las Vegas at a time when the Outfit's flagship casinos were badly crimped due to federal investigations. However, Angelini himself avoided arrest while there.

In the late 1980s, Angelini, Sam "Wings" Carlisi, and John "No Nose" DiFronzo attempted to extend Outfit influence over the gambling operations of the Rincon Indian Reservation near San Diego, California. Their objective was to skim profits off the casino profits there. In 1989, Angelini was sentenced to 37 months in prison on gambling and Racketeer Influenced and Corrupt Organizations Act (RICO) charges resulting from the Rincon operation. On October 14, 1994, Angelini was released from prison.

Death
Donald Angelini died on December 6, 2000.

Notes

References
 Roemer, William F., Jr. (1990) War of the Godfathers: the Bloody Confrontation Between the Chicago and New York Families for the Control of Las Vegas Donald I. Fine, New York,

External links
ISPN Spring 1994 Who Rules Vegas?  By William F. Roemer, Jr.
 American Mafia.com 2000:A Look At Mob Hits, Misses, Disappearances, and Deaths In America
Federal Bureau of Prisons Inmate Locator Website 
http://realdealmafia.com/chicagolist.html

1926 births
2000 deaths
American gangsters of Italian descent
Chicago Outfit mobsters